The white-bellied emerald (Chlorestes candida) is a species of hummingbird in the "emeralds", tribe Trochilini of subfamily Trochilinae. It is found in Belize, Guatemala, Honduras, Mexico, and Nicaragua.

Taxonomy and systematics

The white-bellied emerald was originally placed in genus Amazilia.  A molecular phylogenetic study published in 2014 found that Amazilia was polyphyletic. In 2020 the North American Classification Committee of the American Ornithological Society (AOS) and the International Ornithological Committee (IOC) moved it and four other hummingbirds into genus Chlorestes. In 2021 the Clements taxonomy followed suit. However, the 2020 Version 5 of BirdLife International's Handbook of the Birds of the World retains it in Amazilia.

The white-bellied emerald has three recognized subspecies, the nominate C. c. candida, C. c. genini, and C. c. pacifica.

Description

Adults' upperparts are metallic bronze to bronzy green, with the back usually greener than the crown and neck. The underparts are white with metallic bronzy green from the cheeks to the flanks. The tail is metallic bronze; all but the central pair of feathers have a broad purplish bronze or blackish band near the end, and the outermost two pairs also have dull brownish gray tips. Immatures are similar to adults but the feathers of the crown, rump, and uppertail coverts have brownish tips.

C. c. genini differs from the nominate only in having a longer and broader bill. The bill of C. c. pacifica is also heavier and stouter than that of the nominate, and the green of its back extends further onto the sides and flanks.

Distribution and habitat

The nominate subspecies of white-bellied emerald is found on the Caribbean slope from the Mexican states of Chiapas, Tabasco, and Yucatán south through Belize, Guatemala, and Honduras into Nicaragua. C. c. genini is found in southeastern Mexico north of the nominate between San Luis Potosi and northern Oaxaca. C. c. pacifica is found in extreme southern Chiapas on the Pacific slope of Mexico and disjuctly in Guatemala. Specimens were collected in Costa Rica in the late 19th and early 20th centuries but there are no recent records there.

The white-bellied emerald inhabits the interior and edges of lowland evergreen and semi-deciduous forest.

Behavior

Movement

The white-bellied emerald is resident in most of its range. Local populations make some seasonal movements.

Feeding

The white-bellied emerald often feeds low to the ground but regularly forages at all levels up into the canopy. Its principal diet is nectar taken from a wide variety of flowering plants, and it also seeks insect prey in foliage. It is dominated by the larger rufous-tailed hummingbird (Amazilia tzacati). However, in 2019 a pair of researchers documented a female white-bellied emerald feeding a juvenile rufous-tailed hummingbird.

Breeding

The male white-bellied emerald sings in leks and so is believed to be polygynous. The species' breeding season spans from February to May. Females build a cup nest on a horizontal branch, using plant material and cobweb decorated on the outside with lichen and moss. The clutch size is two eggs.

Vocalization

The white-bellied emerald's song is a "varied, high, thin, slightly shrill chipping, tsi'si-sit' tsi-tsin, also described as "a monotonous, high, squeaky tssi-ip tssi-ip ... or tsip tsip ... etc." Its calls are "mostly rolled or trilled chips, trirr and ti-ti or tsi-tsir, and longer drii-i-i-it and tsi si-si-si-sit, etc."

Status

The IUCN has assessed the white-bellied emerals as being of Least Concern. It has a large range, but its population size is unknown and believed to be decreasing due to habitat destruction.

References

External links
White-bellied emerald photo gallery VIREO 

white-bellied emerald
Birds of Mexico
Birds of the Yucatán Peninsula
Birds of Belize
Birds of Guatemala
Birds of Honduras
Birds of Nicaragua
Hummingbird species of Central America
white-bellied emerald
white-bellied emerald
Taxonomy articles created by Polbot
Taxobox binomials not recognized by IUCN